Joseph Anthony Pepe (born June 18, 1942) is an American prelate of the Roman Catholic Church. He served as the second bishop of the Diocese of Las Vegas in Nevada from 2001 to 2018.

Biography

Early life 
Joseph Pepe was born on June 18, 1942, in Philadelphia, Pennsylvania, as one of the two children of Francis and Elvira (née Fazio) Pepe. He was baptized at St. Francis de Sales Church in Philadelphia. After his graduation from Roman Catholic High School in 1960, Pepe entered St. Charles Borromeo Seminary in Wynnewood, Pennsylvania.

Priesthood 
On May 16, 1970, Pepe was ordained to the priesthood for the Archdiocese of Philadelphia by Cardinal John Krol.

Pepe then served as an assistant pastor at Our Lady of Loreta Parish in Philadelphia while also teaching at Cardinal O'Hara High School in Springfield, Pennsylvania. In 1976, he obtained his Doctor of Canon Law degree from the Pontifical University of Saint Thomas Aquinas in Rome. He was also named defender of the bond for the Metropolitan Tribunal that same year, and prosynodal judge in 1977.

From 1982 to 1987, Pepe served as professor of canon law at St. Charles Borromeo Seminary. He was also appointed vice-chancellor (1987) and chancellor (1990) of the archdiocese; during his tenure in the chancery, he served as vice-promoter for the cause of beatification of Katharine Drexel.

Pepe was raised by the Vatican to the rank of honorary prelate in May 1991, and then served briefly as pastor of St. Justin Martyr Parish in Narberth, Pennsylvania. Upon the special request of Archbishop Michael Sheehan, Pepe was sent to the Archdiocese of Santa Fe in New Mexico in 1993 to serve as judicial vicar. In April 1998, he became chancellor, moderator of the curia, and vicar for priests of the archdiocese.

Bishop of Las Vegas 
On April 6, 2001, Pope John Paul II appointed Pepe as the second bishop of the Diocese of Las Vegas. He was consecrated on May 31 by Cardinal William Levada at Guardian Angel Cathedral in Las Vegas, with Archbishop Sheehan and Bishop Joseph Galante serving as co-consecrators.

On October 18, 2003, Pepe dedicated the Our Lady of LaVang Vietnamese Catholic Community in Las Vegas as a shrine. In 2004, he opened a diocese human resources department along with an Office of Hispanic Ministry, an Office of Liturgy and Worship and a Diocesan Office of Archives. On September 27, 2007, Pepe dedicated Bishop Gorman High School in Las Vegas.

On November 2, 2007, a priest appointed by Pepe to Our Lady of Las Vegas Catholic Parish was sentenced to four to 12 years in state prison for assault.  George Chaanine had assaulted and groped Michaelina Bellamy, the events coordinator, at the church, then evaded arrest for six months. Bellamy's injuries from the assault included a broken hand and two large gashes in her head.  Chaanine later claimed to be in love with Bellamy and investigators found evidence that he provided her with financial support.

Pepe served on the boards of trustees of the Catholic University of America in Washington, D.C.,  the International Dominican Foundation, the Vatican Library in Rome and the Catholic Legal Immigration Network,

On February 28, 2018, Pope Francis accepted Pepe's letter of resignation as bishop of the Diocese of Las Vegas after he reached the mandatory retirement age of 75.

See also
 

 Catholic Church hierarchy
 Catholic Church in the United States
 Historical list of the Catholic bishops of the United States
 List of Catholic bishops of the United States
 Lists of patriarchs, archbishops, and bishops

References

External links
Diocese of Las Vegas

Episcopal succession

1942 births
Living people
St. Charles Borromeo Seminary alumni
Pontifical University of Saint Thomas Aquinas alumni
21st-century Roman Catholic bishops in the United States
Catholic University of America trustees
Clergy from Philadelphia
Roman Catholic bishops of Las Vegas